Machaerina juncea, commonly known as bare twig-rush or tussock swamp twig rush, is a sedge in the sedge family, Cyperaceae, that is native to Australia, New Zealand, and New Caledonia.

Description
The grass-like sedge is rhizomatous and perennial. The terete, rigid, erect, smooth, glaucous culms arise as crowded tufts along rhizome and have one to two distant nodes. The leaves are light brown or reddish sheathing bracts. It blooms between October and March producing brown flowers.

Taxonomy
The species was first formally described by the botanist Tetsuo Koyama in 1956 as part of the work Taxonomic Study of Cyperaceae as published in Botanical Magazine (Tokyo). Many synonyms are known including; Baumea juncea, Chapelliera juncea, Cladium junceum, Cladium ouveanum, Gahnia juncea, Lepidosperma colensoi, Mariscus junceus and Mariscus ouveanus.

Distribution
It is found in New Zealand, commonly found on the North Island and less frequently on the South Island. It is found in coastal areas to lower montane in and around swamps, salt marshes, lake margins and river estuaries.

It is found in coastal areas in all the states of Australia. In Western Australia it is found along coastal areas in the Mid West, Wheatbelt, Peel, South West, Great Southern and Goldfields-Esperance where it grows in water-logged sandy soils.

References

juncea
Flora of Western Australia
Flora of New Zealand